The 2002–03 Maltese FA Trophy was the 65th season since its establishment. The competition started on 2 November 2002 and ended on 22 May 2003 with the final, which Birkirkara won 1-0 against Sliema Wanderers.

First round

|colspan="3" style="background:#fcc;"|2 November 2002

|-
|colspan="3" style="background:#fcc;"|9 November 2002

|-
|colspan="3" style="background:#fcc;"|16 November 2002

|-
|colspan="3" style="background:#fcc;"|23 November 2002

|}

Second round

|colspan="3" style="background:#fcc;"|8 February 2003

|-
|colspan="3" style="background:#fcc;"|9 February 2003

|}

Quarter-finals

|colspan="3" style="background:#fcc;"|21 March 2003

|-
|colspan="3" style="background:#fcc;"|22 March 2003

|}

Semi-finals

Final

References

External links
 RSSSF page

Malta
Maltese FA Trophy seasons
Cup